1936 in sports describes the year's events in world sport.

Alpine skiing
FIS Alpine World Ski Championships
6th FIS Alpine World Ski Championships are held at Innsbruck, Austria.  The events are a downhill, a slalom and a combined race in both the men's and women's categories.  The winners are:
 Men's Downhill – Rudolf Rominger (Switzerland)
 Men's Slalom – Rudolph Matt (Austria)
 Men's Combined – Rudolf Rominger (Switzerland)
 Women's Downhill – Evelyn Pinching (Great Britain)
 Women's Slalom – Gerda Paumgarten (Austria)
 Women's Combined – Evelyn Pinching (Great Britain)

American football
 NFL Championship: the Green Bay Packers won 21–6 over the Boston Redskins. The game was moved from Boston to New York's Polo Grounds due to fan apathy.
 Rose Bowl (1935 season):
 The SMU Mustangs lose 7–0 to the Stanford Indians; share national championship
 Minnesota Golden Gophers – college football national championship; first season in which a national champion was declared by the AP Poll.
 First NFL Draft held
 Second American Football League (AFL) founded
 Cleveland Rams founded by Homer Marsh as part of AFL

Association football
England
 First Division – Sunderland win the 1935–36 title.
 FA Cup – Arsenal beat Sheffield United 1–0, thanks to a Ted Drake goal.
Spain
 La Liga won by Athletic Bilbao
Germany
 German football championship won by Nürnberg
Italy
 Serie A won by Bologna
Portugal
 Primeira Liga won by S.L. Benfica
France
 French Division 1 won by RC Paris
Ukraine
 FC Shakhtar Donetsk was founded in May (Former part of Soviet Union)

Australian rules football
 Victorian Football League
 Collingwood wins the 40th VFL Premiership, beating South Melbourne 11.23 (89) to 10.18 (78) in the 1936 VFL Grand Final.
 Brownlow Medal awarded to Dinny Ryan (Fitzroy)
 South Australian National Football League
 1 August: Glenelg 14.9 (93) defeat South Adelaide 9.32 (86) despite having 23 scoring shots against South's 41. The eighteen-shot deficit is the greatest deficit in scoring shots by a winning team in a major Australian Rules league.
 3 October: Port Adelaide 13.19 (97) defeat Sturt 14.10 (94) for their first premiership since 1929 and their eleventh overall. It is the only SANFL Grand Final where the winning team scored fewer goals than the losing team.
 Magarey Medal won by Bill McCallum (Norwood)
 Western Australian National Football League
 10 October: East Perth 11.5 (71) defeat Claremont 9.6 (60) to win their eighth WANFL premiership.
 Sandover Medal won by George Moloney (Claremont)

Baseball
 Japanese Baseball League, as predecessor for Japan Central League and Pacific League of Japan, a first officially game held on February 9.
 Plans are announced for a Baseball Hall of Fame to be established in 1939, the game's supposed centennial, in Cooperstown, New York. In the first elections to select 15 initial inductees (5 from the 19th century and 10 from the 20th), Ty Cobb, Babe Ruth, Honus Wagner, Christy Mathewson and Walter Johnson are selected from the 20th century; the election for 19th century players is plagued by problems and results in no selections. See: Baseball Hall of Fame balloting, 1936
 World Series – New York Yankees defeat the New York Giants, 4–2.
 Nagoya Baseball Club, as predecessor for Chunichi Dragons, officially founded in Japan on January 15.

Basketball
 August 14 – 1936 Summer Olympics: The United States men's national basketball team wins the first Olympic basketball tournament in the final game over Canada, 19–8.
 The first season for Argentine Basketball Club Championship League was held, Huracan de Rosario has first season's champion.

Boxing
Events
 19 June – in one of boxing's biggest-ever upsets, Max Schmeling knocks out Joe Louis at 2:29 of round 12 at New York's Yankee Stadium
Lineal world champions
 World Heavyweight Championship – James J. Braddock
 World Light Heavyweight Championship – John Henry Lewis
 World Middleweight Championship – vacant
 World Welterweight Championship – Barney Ross
 World Lightweight Championship – Tony Canzoneri → Lou Ambers
 World Featherweight Championship – vacant
 World Bantamweight Championship – Sixto Escobar → Tony Marino → Sixto Escobar
 World Flyweight Championship – vacant → Benny Lynch

Cricket
Events
 Australia tours South Africa, winning the five-test series three tests to nil.
England
 County Championship – Derbyshire
 Minor Counties Championship – Hertfordshire
 Most runs – Patsy Hendren 2,654 @ 47.39 (HS 202)
 Most wickets – Hedley Verity 216 @ 13.18 (BB 9–12)
 India play a three-Test series of England, losing two and drawing one    
 Wisden Cricketers of the Year – Charlie Barnett, Bill Copson, Alf Gover, Vijay Merchant, Stan Worthington 
Australia
 Sheffield Shield – South Australia
 Most runs – Don Bradman 1,173 @ 130.33 (HS 369)
 Most wickets – Frank Ward 50 @ 20.94 (BB 6–47)
India
 Ranji Trophy – Bombay beat Madras by 190 runs
 Bombay Quadrangular – Hindus
New Zealand
 Plunket Shield – Wellington
South Africa
 Currie Cup – Western Province
West Indies
 Inter-Colonial Tournament – British Guiana

Cycling
Tour de France
 Sylvère Maes wins the 30th Tour de France
Giro d'Italia
 Gino Bartali of Legnano wins the 24th Giro d'Italia

Field Hockey
 Olympic Games (Men's Competition) in Berlin won by India

Figure skating
 World Figure Skating Championships:
 Men's singles: Karl Schäfer
 Ladies’ singles: Sonja Henie
 Pairs: Maxi Herber and Ernst Baier
 1936 Winter Olympics
 Men's singles: Karl Schäfer
 Ladies’ singles: Sonja Henie
 Pairs: Maxi Herber and Ernst Baier

Golf
Men's professional
 Masters Tournament – Horton Smith
 U.S. Open – Tony Manero
 British Open – Alf Padgham
 PGA Championship – Denny Shute
Men's amateur
 British Amateur – Hector Thomson
 U.S. Amateur – Johnny Fischer
Women's professional
 Women's Western Open – Opal Hill

Horse racing
 May 8 – jockey Ralph Neves was involved in a racing accident at Bay Meadows Racetrack in San Mateo, California and mistakenly pronounced dead. A while later, he woke up in the morgue and promptly returned to the racetrack but was not allowed to compete in any of the remaining races because of his "death". 
Steeplechases
 Cheltenham Gold Cup – Golden Miller
 Grand National – Reynoldstown
Flat races
 Australia – Melbourne Cup won by Wotan
 Canada – King's Plate won by Monsweep
 France – Prix de l'Arc de Triomphe won by Corrida
 Ireland – Irish Derby Stakes won by Raeburn
 English Triple Crown Races:
 2,000 Guineas Stakes – Pay Up
 The Derby – Mahmoud
 St. Leger Stakes – Boswell
 United States Triple Crown Races:
 Kentucky Derby – Bold Venture
 Preakness Stakes – Bold Venture
 Belmont Stakes – Granville

Ice hockey
 The Detroit Red Wings win the Stanley Cup Championship 3 games to 1 over the Toronto Maple Leafs 
Combining this with the Detroit Tigers World Series win and the Detroit Lions NFL Championship, in 1935, Detroit played home to the Championship teams in the MLB, NFL, and NHL in one 12-month period. This feat has yet to be duplicated by any other city.
 The first season of Czechoslovak Extraliga was held, which separated into Czech Extraliga and Tipsport Ice-hockey Liga of Slovakia from this league on 1993.

Motorsport

Olympic Games
 The infamous 1936 Summer Olympics take place in Berlin
 Germany wins the most medals (89) and the most gold medals (33)
 Jesse Owens wins four athletics gold medals
 The first torch relay takes place from Olympia, Greece
 1936 Winter Olympics takes place in Garmisch-Partenkirchen, Germany
 Norway wins the most medals (15) and the most gold medals (7)

Rowing
The Boat Race
 4 April — Cambridge wins the 88th Oxford and Cambridge Boat Race

Rugby league
1935–36 European Rugby League Championship / 1936–37 European Rugby League Championship
1936 New Zealand rugby league season
1936 NSWRFL season
1936–37 Northern Rugby Football League season / 1935–36 Northern Rugby Football League season

Rugby union
 49th Home Nations Championship series is won by Wales

Snooker
 World Snooker Championship – Joe Davis beats Horace Lindrum 34–27

Speed skating
Events
 Inaugural World Allround Speed Skating Championships for Women is held in Stockholm
Speed Skating World Championships
 Men's All-round Champion – Ivar Ballangrud (Norway)
 Women's All-round Champion – Kit Klein (USA)
1936 Winter Olympics (Men)
 500m – gold medal: Ivar Ballangrud (Norway)
 1500m – gold medal: Charles Mathiesen (Norway)
 5000m – gold medal: Ivar Ballangrud (Norway)
 10000m – gold medal: Ivar Ballangrud (Norway)
1936 Winter Olympics (Women)
 not contested

Tennis
Australia
 Australian Men's Singles Championship – Adrian Quist (Australia) defeats Jack Crawford (Australia) 6–2, 6–3, 4–6, 3–6, 9–7
 Australian Women's Singles Championship – Joan Hartigan Bathurst (Australia) defeats Nancye Wynne Bolton (Australia) 6–4, 6–4
England
 Wimbledon Men's Singles Championship – Fred Perry (Great Britain) defeats Gottfried von Cramm (Germany) 6–1, 6–1, 6–0
 Wimbledon Women's Singles Championship – Helen Jacobs (USA) defeats Hilde Krahwinkel Sperling (Denmark) 6–2, 4–6, 7–5
France
 French Men's Singles Championship – Gottfried von Cramm (Germany) defeats Fred Perry (Great Britain) 6–0, 2–6, 6–2, 2–6, 6–0
 French Women's Singles Championship – Hilde Krahwinkel Sperling (Germany) defeats Simonne Mathieu (France) 6–3, 6–4
USA
 American Men's Singles Championship – Fred Perry (Great Britain) defeats Don Budge (USA) 2–6, 6–2, 8–6, 1–6, 10–8
 American Women's Singles Championship – Alice Marble (USA) defeats Helen Jacobs (USA) 4–6, 6–3, 6–2
Davis Cup
 1936 International Lawn Tennis Challenge –  at 3–2  at Centre Court, Wimbledon (grass) London, United Kingdom

Awards
 Associated Press Male Athlete of the Year – Jesse Owens, Track and field
 Associated Press Female Athlete of the Year – Helen Stephens, Track and field

References

 
Sports by year